The President's House was built in 1953 and served as the primary residence for every University of Florida president until 2006, when President Bernie Machen chose to relocate to a private residence off campus. It was replaced in 2015 with the Dasburg House which is the current residence of the President of UF. It was re-named Earl and Christy Powell University House.   The facility now is open to UF organizations and groups that want to entertain, meet or hold a retreat there.

References

External links
https://president.ufl.edu/office/house/ Official website]
Gainesville Sun article about President's House

Houses completed in 1953
Buildings at the University of Florida
Houses in Alachua County, Florida
1953 establishments in Florida
University and college buildings completed in 1953